Alex Biryukov is a cryptographer, currently a full professor at the University of Luxembourg. His notable work includes the design of the stream cipher LEX, as well as the cryptanalysis of numerous cryptographic primitives. In 1998, he developed impossible differential cryptanalysis together with Eli Biham and Adi Shamir. In 1999, he developed the slide attack together with David Wagner. In 2009 he developed, together with Dmitry Khovratovich, the first cryptanalytic attack on full-round AES-192 and AES-256 that is faster than a brute-force attack. In 2015 he developed the Argon2 key derivation function with Daniel Dinu and Dmitry Khovratovich.
Since 1994 Alex Biryukov is a member of the International Association for Cryptologic Research.

References

External links
 Alex Biryukov’s current page at the University of Luxembourg
 CryptoLUX > Alex Biryukov
 Alex Biryukov's old home page at K.U. Leuven
 Alex Biryukov - Google Scholar Citations

Modern cryptographers
Living people
Year of birth missing (living people)
Academic staff of the University of Luxembourg
Israeli computer scientists
Israeli cryptographers
Russian cryptographers
21st-century Russian inventors